Fly or Die is the second studio album by American rap rock band N.E.R.D. It was released on March 23, 2004.

Production
The band recorded its second album Fly or Die during 2003. The band actually learned the instruments needed to play the tunes, so they could perform live. As Chad Hugo told MTV News on December 8, 2003, "We're the ones playing the instruments live this time. I just started playing guitar last year so I'm learning as we go. Pharrell's playing drums. Last time, (on In Search of...) we didn't have time to learn certain instruments so we got Spymob to help us out."

The band also recruited some assistance to record the album with Lenny Kravitz and Questlove playing on the track "Maybe." Several of tracks concern issues of particular concern to adolescents including "Thrasher" about bullies, "Drill Sergeant" about rebellion and conscription, and first love on "Backseat Love".

Reception

Fly or Die went on sale on March 23, 2004. The lead single "She Wants to Move" went into the Top 5 in U.K, top 10 in New Zealand, top 20 in Norway, Italy, Ireland and Denmark and top 40 in Australia and the Netherlands as of March 2004. Fly or Die sold 412,000 copies in the United States, but shipped at least 500,000 units making it qualify for RIAA's Gold Certification.

Rolling Stone (4/15/04, p. 147) - 3 stars out of 5 - "It's fascinating to hear these rap geniuses go undercover as a bar band you might hear rocking Journey covers in a bowling alley."

Entertainment Weekly (4/2/04, p. 62) - "Fly or Die is craftier and more multilayered than its predecessor....[A] set of clever, complex, studio-crafted pop--complete with musicianly, smooth-jazz licks--that doesn't owe allegiance to any one genre." - Rating: A-

Uncut (p. 91) - 5 stars out of 5 - "N*E*R*D can replicate machine hypersyncopation at the drop of a hi-hat. Prog-pop album of year."

Uncut (p. 74) - Ranked #18 in Uncut's "Best Albums of 2004" - "[A]n object lesson in eclectic art-rock....[T]his prog-pop classic reveal further depths of detail with every repeated play."

Mojo (p. 106) - 4 stars out of 5 - "This is an enthusiastic hymn to the terminally uncool, an un-ironic celebration of nerd-culture....They make a party you want to be invited to."

It was included in the book 1001 Albums You Must Hear Before You Die.

Track listing

Charts

Weekly charts

Year-end charts

Certifications

References

External links
 N*E*R*D web site
 
 VH1 N*E*R*D page
 Top 40 Charts entry for "She Wants to Move"
 

2004 albums
N.E.R.D. albums
Albums produced by the Neptunes
Star Trak Entertainment albums
Virgin Records albums